Jean-Pierre Sintges (born 1 June 1938) is a Luxembourgian racing cyclist. He rode in the 1961 Tour de France.

References

1938 births
Living people
Luxembourgian male cyclists
Place of birth missing (living people)